PKN Arts & Science College is one among the Arts and Science colleges of Madurai district, suited in suburb of Tirumangalam, Madurai. It was established by the PKN Vidhyasala Educational Trust in the year 1996. The College was affiliated with Madurai Kamaraj University and received Best College Award for the years 2005, 2006, 2008. And also it was the first Arts & Science College in Tirumangalam taluk.

See this also 
 Shri Pathirakali Mariamman Temple
 PKN Vidhyasala

External links 
 College Official Website

Colleges in Tamil Nadu
Education in Madurai district
Educational institutions established in 1996
1996 establishments in Tamil Nadu